Maracaju Mountain Range is located in Mato Grosso do Sul.

Mountain ranges of Brazil